Meiognathus is an extinct genus of conodonts belonging to the family Sweetognathidae.

Meiognathus pustulus is from the Permian (Kungurian) of Hatahoko, Japan.

References

External links 

Ozarkodinida genera
Permian conodonts
Cisuralian animals